No Rain, No Rainbow is the fourth studio album by the American metalcore band, Greeley Estates. It is their last release with the guitarist Alex Torres. Its only single was "Loyal.com". The album is Greeley Estates' heaviest release, with many songs having fast tempos and blast beats, and with some songs completely absent of clean vocals.

The opening track, "Seven Hours", features the frontman Ryan Zimmerman's wife, Michelle. There are many other guest vocalists on the album, including Craig Mabbitt of Escape the Fate, Beau Bokan and Jared Warth of Blessthefall and Cameron Martin of The Irish Front.

Track listing

Personnel
Greeley Estates
 Ryan Zimmerman – lead vocals
 Brandon Hackenson – lead guitars, programming
 Alex Torres – guitars
 David Ludlow – bass guitar
 Chris Julian – drums

Guest vocalists
Michelle Zimmerman, Kari Trummel 
Amy Cooper - track 1
Cameron Martin on tracks 2, 4, and 12
Craig Mabbitt - tracks 2 and 6
 Jared Warth - tracks 2 and 7
 Beau Bokan - track 9

Additional personnel
All music written and arranged by Greeley Estates
Greeley Estates Music LLC (BMI)/Tragic Hero Records
Recorded, programmed, engineered, mixed and mastered by Cory Spotts
Produced by Cory Spotts and Greeley Estates
Additional programming and engineering by Brandon Hackenson and David Ludlow
Recorded at Bluelight Audio, Phoenix, Arizona
Drum tech: Marty Welker
Booking: Matt Pike (The Kenmore Agency)
Legal representation: Lisa Socransky
A&R: Tommy LaCombe
Illustrations: Ryan Peterson (Fallencircus.com)
Design/layout: Brian Trummel (TheBlackRhinos.com)

References

2010 albums
Greeley Estates albums
Tragic Hero Records albums